Jean-Pierre Haigneré (born 19 May 1948) is a French Air Force officer and a former CNES spationaut.

Jean-Pierre Haigneré was born in Paris, France, and joined the French Air Force, where he trained as a test pilot.

He flew on two missions to the Mir space station in 1993 and 1999. The Mir Perseus (Mir EO-27) long-duration mission (186 days) in 1999 also included an EVA.
In addition to his duties at the European Space Agency, Jean-Pierre Haigneré is also involved in a European space tourism initiative, the Astronaute Club Européen (ACE), which he co-founded with Alain Dupas and Laurent Gathier.

Family
He is married to former French astronaut Claudie Haigneré. The asteroid 135268 Haigneré is named in their combined honour.

References

External links
 CNES Biography
 ESA profile page
 Website of Astronaute Club Européen

1948 births
Living people
French spationauts
Knights of the Ordre national du Mérite
École de l'air alumni
French Air and Space Force personnel
Spacewalkers
Mir crew members